John Freame (1669–1745) was an English goldsmith and banker. In 1690 he co-founded Freame & Gould, which later became Barclays Bank.

Early life
John, son of Robert Freame, was born in 1669 in Cirencester, England, and baptised on 11 November of the same year. In 1683, he was apprenticed to Job Bolton, a Quaker goldsmith based in Lombard Street.

Career
Upon completion of his apprenticeship, Freame gained his Freedom of the City on 7 April 1690, giving him the right to open a business within the City of London as a goldsmith, and went into partnership with Thomas Gould, a fellow Quaker. Located in a part of the City where a quarter of the population were Quakers, they were able to build up their reputation — and their business, particularly amongst Quakers. They traded as Freame & Gould under the sign of three anchors, building a good reputation.

In 1728, the business moved to 54 Lombard Street, identified as the ‘Sign of the Black Spread Eagle’. Signs were used to identify buildings in an age when few people could read, and, as buildings changed hands, signs would remain.

The Barclay name entered the business in 1736, when James Barclay, who had married one of John Freame's daughters, was taken into the partnership by his brother-in-law, Joseph. Barclays continued to trade from the house in Lombard Street and became identified with the Spread Eagle, which was granted as the bank’s coat of arms in 1937.

In 1713, Freame published Scripture Instruction: Digested into Several Sections by Way of Questions & Answers in Order to Promote Piety & Virtue, and Discourage Vice & Immorality, with a Preface Relating to Education.

Personal life
On 19 August 1697, at the Friends' Meeting at Devonshire House, London, Freame married Priscilla Gould, a sister of his business partner Thomas Gould, who himself married Freame's sister Hannah.

John and Priscilla Freame had eight children, including:

 Mary Freame (1700-1760), married Thomas Plumstead.
 Joseph Freame (1701-1766, married Anne Osgood; followed his father into the business.
 Priscilla Freame (1702-1769) was the second wife of David Barclay of Cheapside, and they had eight children together, including David Barclay of Youngsbury (1729–1809).
 Sarah Freame (1708-1769), married James Barclay (1708-1766), the first Barclay in the bank.

Death
He died in 1745.

References

1669 births
1745 deaths
People from Cirencester
English company founders
English bankers
English Quakers
Barclays people